Trichoneura  is a genus of plants in the grass family. It has a scattered distribution in Africa, Arabia, and the Americas.

 Species
 Trichoneura ciliata (Peter) S.M.Phillips - Ethiopia, Kenya, Tanzania
 Trichoneura elegans Swallen - Texas, Tamaulipas
 Trichoneura eleusinoides (Rendle) Ekman  - Angola, Namibia
 Trichoneura grandiglumis (Nees) Ekman - Ethiopia, Tanzania, Zambia, Angola, Mozambique, Zimbabwe, Botswana, Cape Province, Namibia, Lesotho, KwaZulu-Natal, Eswatini, Free State, Gauteng, Mpumalanga, Limpopo
 Trichoneura lindleyana (Kunth) Ekman - Galápagos
 Trichoneura mollis (Kunth) Ekman - Sahara and Arabian Peninsula from Mali to Egypt and Oman
 Trichoneura schlechteri Ekman - Mozambique, Limpopo
 Trichoneura weberbaueri Pilg. - Chile, Peru

References

Chloridoideae
Poaceae genera